Iva Majoli was the defending champion but lost in the semifinals to Jana Novotná.

Novotná won in the final 6–2, 6–2 against Martina Hingis.

Seeds
A champion seed is indicated in bold text while text in italics indicates the round in which that seed was eliminated. The top four seeds received a bye to the second round.

  Conchita Martínez (second round)
  Iva Majoli (semifinals)
  Anke Huber (semifinals)
  Jana Novotná (champion)
  Martina Hingis (final)
  Brenda Schultz-McCarthy (quarterfinals)
  Magdalena Maleeva (second round)
  Amanda Coetzer (first round)

Draw

Final

Section 1

Section 2

External links
 1996 Barilla Indoors draw

Zurich Open
1996 WTA Tour